Robert "Bob" Marshall Heydenfeldt (born September 17, 1933) is a former American and Canadian football player.

Heydenfeldt played Tight end and Punter for coach Red Sanders at University of California, Los Angeles (UCLA) from 1952-1954. He was a member of the Bruins team that lost the 1954 Rose Bowl and was named that year's FWAA & UPI National Champions. He was commissioned a 2nd lieutenant in the United States Air Force Reserves upon graduation from UCLA. He played professionally for the Edmonton Eskimos of the Western Interprovincial Football Union. Heydenfeldt returned to the U.S. after one season in Canada and joined the Air Force. He was stationed at Hamilton Air Force Base in Novato, California and played End for the base football team. He later opened a sporting goods store with former UCLA teammate Don Long.

References

1933 births
Living people
American football punters
American football tight ends
Edmonton Elks players
Players of American football from Los Angeles
UCLA Bruins football players
People from Canoga Park, Los Angeles
United States Air Force officers
United States Air Force reservists
Players of Canadian football from Los Angeles